"Too Much to Do" is the second single taken from Sparkadia's debut album Postcards. "Too Much to Do" brought Sparkadia recognition after large amounts of airplay and the 'Too Much to Do Tour'. The single was a commercial success and not only in Australia but the UK. It was the first single to be released physically.

Track listing
 Too Much to Do
 The Plague

Chart positions
Australia - #99 (Physical Release)

Music video
Music video was shot in Sydney, Australia. It was directed by Daniel Reisinger and Max Brown and choreographed by Richard James Allen. It features some trick photography with the band playing along with people moving in fast motion.

References

2008 singles
2008 songs
Song recordings produced by Ben Hillier
Ivy League Records singles